Iona Tuskiya (1901–1963) was a Soviet composer from Georgia SSR. He composed music for various movies, such as Eliso in 1928. In 1943, he along with several other composers, had entries for a contest to find out what song should be chosen as the National Anthem of the Soviet Union; the contest was eventually won by Alexander Alexandrov. His students included composers Vaja Azarashvili, Dagmara Slianova-Mizandari and Tamara Antonovna Shaverzashvili.

References 

1901 births
1963 deaths
Burials at Didube Pantheon
20th-century composers